The Duluth-Superior Dukes was the final moniker of the minor league baseball team, that represented Duluth, Minnesota and Superior, Wisconsin, playing from 1956 to 1970 exclusively as members of the Northern League.

Duluth-Superior teams were affiliates of the Chicago White Sox (1956–1959), Detroit Tigers (1960–1965), Chicago Cubs (1965–1967) and Chicago White Sox (1967–1970).

History

The franchise formed in 1956 as the Duluth-Superior White Sox after a merger of the Duluth Dukes and the Superior Blues. The team name was changed back to the Dukes in 1960.

From 1960 to 1964, they were affiliated with the Detroit Tigers. In 1965, they were affiliated with the Tigers and Chicago Cubs. In 1966, they were affiliated with the Cubs. In 1967, they were affiliated with the Cubs and Chicago White Sox. From 1968 to 1970, they were affiliated with the White Sox alone.

The ballpark

The Dukes played their home games at Wade Stadium, located at 101 N. 35th Avenue West Duluth, Minnesota 55807. The stadium, built in 1940 is still in use today as home to the Duluth Huskies.

Year-by-year record

Notable alumni

 Gates Brown (1960)
 Pat Dobson (1962) MLB All-Star
 Bill Freehan (1961) 11x MLB All-Star
 John Hiller (1964) MLB All-Star
 Glen Hobbie (1956)
 Joe Hoerner (1957–1959) MLB All-Star
 Willie Horton (1962) 4x MLB All-Star
 Ira Hutchinson (1967, MGR)
 Pat Jarvis (1962–1963)
 Lamar Johnson (1970)
 Bruce Kimm (1970)
 Denny McLain (1963) 3x MLB All-Star; 2x AL Cy Young Award (1968–1969); 1968 AL Most Valuable Player
 J.C. Martin (1958)
 Don Mincher (1956–1957) 2x MLB All-Star
 Jim Northrup  (1961–1962)
 Jim Rooker (1964)
 Joe Sparma (1963)
 Mickey Stanley (1961–1962) 5x Gold Glove

Other Major League player alumni
(from baseball-reference.com)
1960 – Aubrey Gatewood, Ray Oyler, Willie Smith
1961 – Leo Marentette, Tom Timmermann
1962 – Ike Brown, Vern Holtgrave
1963 – Pete Craig
1964 – Arlo Brunsberg, Wayne Comer, Jack DiLauro, Andy Kosco
1965 – Bill Butler
1968 – Don Eddy, Dan Neumeier, Scott Northey, Denny O'Toole
1969 – Stan Perzanowski, Glenn Redmon, Hugh Yancy
1970 – Bruce Miller, Hugh Yancy

Baseball teams established in 1956
Professional baseball teams in Minnesota
1956 establishments in Minnesota
1970 disestablishments in Minnesota
Northern League (1902-71) baseball teams
Chicago Cubs minor league affiliates
Chicago White Sox minor league affiliates
Detroit Tigers minor league affiliates
Defunct baseball teams in Minnesota
Baseball teams disestablished in 1970